Left Independentists (IdE) is a Catalan nationalist political platform founded on 5 September 2020 in support of Catalan independence. The platform ran within the Together for Catalonia (JxCat) party in the 2021 Catalan regional election, securing one seat.

References

2020 establishments in Catalonia
Catalan nationalist parties
Left-wing nationalist parties
Political parties established in 2020
Political parties in Catalonia